The BSA Light Six was a small car in the twelve tax horsepower class manufactured for BSA Cars by BSA subsidiary The Daimler Company Limited.
Announced in September 1934 it was a cheaper and less well-finished  version of the Lanchester Light Six

It was described by the motoring correspondent of The Times as not intended to be a replacement for the Ten but as an alternative model perhaps for the more fastidious

Engine

Chassis
The larger twelve horsepower six-cylinder engine was mounted in the chassis of the ten horsepower four-cylinder BSA Ten. Steering was by cam and lever, brakes were mechanical. Tyres specified were 5 inch on 18 inch wheels.

Prices
Six-light saloon and fixed head coupé £315
Streamlined saloon and sports saloon £325

References

Light Six
Cars introduced in 1934